Hammond School may refer to,

The Hammond School, professional performing arts school in Chester, United Kingdom
Hammond School (South Carolina), in Columbia, South Carolina
Hammond High School (Columbia, Maryland), in Columbia, Maryland
Hammond High School (Indiana) in Hammond, Indiana
Hammond High School (Louisiana) in Hammond, Louisiana